Sarojini Nadar (born 6 February 1976) is a South African theologian and biblical scholar who is the Desmond Tutu Research Chair in Religion and Social Justice at the University of the Western Cape.

Early life and education
Sarojini Nadar, whose first name means "lotus flower", was born on 6 February 1976. She is of Indian descent and grew up in the Indian township of Phoenix, KwaZulu-Natal. Nadar is the youngest of seven children born to a poor family. Her father died when she was eight years old and none of her siblings finished high school. After experiencing abuse in the home, she left to live with an older sister in Grade 10.  She graduated from Effingham Secondary School in Durban in 1993. She has said that her career in gender and religion was shaped by reflections on how her mother's life was determined by cultural and religious norms, including being in an arranged marriage at 17, and the lack of opportunities she received.

Nadar received a Bachelor of Arts in English literature and religious studies from the University of Cape Town in 1996, and a Bachelor of Social Science in 1997 and Master of Arts in 2000 in biblical literature from the same university. She received her PhD in biblical hermeneutics and gender from the University of Natal in 2003 at the age of 27. Her thesis, titled Power, ideology and interpretation/s: womanist and literary perspectives on the book of Esther as resources for gender-social transformation, looked at the Book of Esther as a "text of terror" in normalising rape culture. While completing it, she confronted the man who had raped her, leading to a seven-year trial. Her rapist confessed before he died in 2010, leaving the trial unfinished.

Career and research
Nadar was a professor at the University of KwaZulu-Natal. From 2005 until 2012, she was Director of the Gender and Religion Programme, which she cofounded. She was appointed Dean of Research for the College of Humanities in 2012 and promoted to Full Professor in 2014. She has said many of her students, who were mostly older men and leaders in the church, found it difficult to accept her as their teacher.

In 2014, Nadar was a Fellow of the Stellenbosch Institute For Advanced Study, working on a project on gender violence with Elisabeth Gerle. In 2016, she was appointed Director of the Desmond Tutu Centre for Religion and Justice, and Desmond Tutu Research Chair at University of the Western Cape.

Nadar's research has focused on gender and education, including gender-based violence, sexual and reproductive health, and critical pedagogy in higher education. She has published on feminist biblical hermeneutics with a special focus on HIV/AIDS and sexuality. She is on the editorial board of the Journal of Feminist Studies in Religion and is co-editor of the Journal of Constructive Theology — Gender and Religion in Africa. She is a member of the Circle of Concerned African Women Theologians.

As an African feminist biblical scholar, Nadar uses a methodology she calls the "Tripolar Model", with three stages: conceptualisation, distantiation, and appropriation.

Awards and honours
In 2012, Nadar received the KwaZulu-Natal's Distinguished Young Women in Science Award (human and social sciences) and in 2013, the university's Distinguished Teachers’ Award.

The South African National Research Foundation has awarded her its highest accolade, a Tier 1 Research Chair. Her 2012 book African Women, Religion and Health, co-edited with Isabel Apawo Phiri, won the UKZN's annual book award for Best Edited Book, and a New York Catholic Press award.

Personal life
Nadar has been married to Poovan Nadar, a chemical engineer, since 1996 and they have two children.

Selected publications

Books

Chapters

Journal articles

References

Living people
1976 births
South African people of Indian descent
People from Durban
University of Cape Town alumni
University of Natal alumni
Academic staff of the University of KwaZulu-Natal
South African women writers
South African writers
South African women academics
South African biblical scholars
Women Christian theologians
21st-century Protestant theologians
Christian feminist theologians
Christian feminist biblical scholars
HIV/AIDS activists
Academic staff of the University of the Western Cape